Kreps is a surname. Notable people with the surname include:

 David M. Kreps (born 1950), game theorist and economist and professor
 Dean Kreps (born 1961), American football coach and former player
 Gary L Kreps, communication scholar
 Juanita M. Kreps (1921–2010), U.S. Secretary of Commerce
 Kamil Kreps (born 1984), Czech professional ice hockey player